Thampalakkad is a small village in Kottayam district, Kerala, which is located around 5 km from Kanjirappally on the way to Manjakuzhy. It has the same distance from Ponkunnam, Manjakuzhy, Koorali, Anakkal, Kappadu, Panamattom and Vanchimala. Its name is derived from Thamboolam which was used for fixing the idol at the Mahadeva Temple, by the legendary Naranathu Bhranthan.

Demographics
It is inhabited by around 3000 people, mainly small farmers and employees of government departments and private establishments. It is home to the Sri Mahadeva Temple, St. Thomas Church, Mahakalipara Devi Temple, Illathappan Kavu Temple, Penuel Ashram, Emmanuel Ashram, IMS Devotional Center, St. Rita's School, SNDP Yogam Unit, NSS Veda Vyasa School, Govt. LP School, NSS School and the St. Anthony's Church, Manthara.  This place bears the Postal code 686506. Prominent places are Thekkumbhagam, Pallikavala, Manthra, Shaapupadi, Panamattom Cross or 4th Mile.

History
This family was the rulers of the area with all powers including capital punishment during the time prior to the British rule. All the powers were conferred to Karisseril family by the local kingdom Thekkumkoor, the capital of which was Changanacherry.

This family is disintegrated now and Smt. K N Thankamma is the current head of the family. Some other popular families here include Thekkumthottam, Thottuvayil, Naranathu, Vattakkattu (Kunnumpurathu), Kadakkayam, Kathayanatu, Parappallil, Mundakal etc.

Economy
The villagers are predominantly rubber planters and government employees. Crops are mainly confined to rubber as it is every where in Kottayam district, even though plantations of nutmeg, tapioca, ginger etc. are seen in some parts.

Worship centers and institutions
 Sri Mahadeva Temple
 St. Thomas Church
 Sri Mahakalipara Devi Temple
 Illathappan Kavu Temple
 NSS U P School
 Govt. LP School
 St. Reetha's LP School
 Sri Veda Vyasa School
 Post Office
 Kanjirapally Cooperative Bank

References

Villages in Kottayam district